Blumenort is an unincorporated community in Lac Pelletier Rural Municipality No. 107, Saskatchewan, Canada. The community is located on Highway 4, about 34 km south of the city of Swift Current.

See also 
 List of communities in Saskatchewan
 Blumenort, Manitoba

References 

Lac Pelletier No. 107, Saskatchewan
Unincorporated communities in Saskatchewan
Ghost towns in Saskatchewan
Division No. 4, Saskatchewan